Gerald Gregg (January 25, 1907 – April 1, 1985)  was an American artist famous for his works on paperback novel covers. He was born in Lamar, Colorado and lived in Racine, Wisconsin, where he died.

Together with Robert C. Stanley, he was one of the most two prolific paperback book cover artists employed by the Dell Publishing Company for whom Gregg worked from 1943 to 1950. He also worked for Wisconsin based
Western Printing and Lithographing Company and drew comic strips and the back covers of their Little Golden Books.

Gregg prepared almost all his cover work by airbrush, had a style which was a combination of graphic design and stylized realism and his covers were almost similar to film noir of the period.

Books
 Design Literacy: Understanding Graphic Design, Heller, Steven, 2nd Edition, Skyhorse Publishing Inc., Allworth Press, New York, NY, 2004.
 Paperbacks, U.S.A.: A Graphic History, 1939-1959. Schreuders, Piet E., Blue Dolphin Enterprises-Distributed by Pacific Comics Distributors, San Diego, California, 1981.
 The Book of Paperbacks: A Visual History Of The Paperback. Schreuders, Piet E., Virgin Books, London, 1981

External links
 Biography & Works of Gerald Gregg at the "Gerald Gregg Covers"
 Gerald Gregg at PulpCovers.com
 Gerald Gregg at Golden Age Comic Book Stories
 Gerald Gregg at Vintage Paperback Artists
 Gerald Gregg at the Thrilling Detective Website: Some Great Pulp & Paperback Cover Artists
 Gerald Gregg at Vintage Romance Covers
 Several Gerald Gregg Covers
 Dell Map Back Mysteries: They Don't Make 'em Like That Anymore ! by Gary Lovisi at Mystery Scene magazine
 Neglected Books Page
  Look of Love: The Art of the Romance Novel
 Gerald Gregg Covers at PulpCovers.Com

References

American illustrators
People from Lamar, Colorado
People from Racine, Wisconsin
Artists from Colorado
Artists from Wisconsin
1907 births
1985 deaths